Robert MacDonald Ford, Jr. (May 2, 1911 – June 9, 2004) was an American  insurance agent who served as a Democratic<ref>United Press. "Annual State Census Is Proposed in Bill" Spokane Daily Chronicle February 13, 1951; p. 1, col. 4</ref> state representative for the Bremerton area of the State of Washington from 1941 to 1943 and from 1945 to 1953.  Ford was Democratic Floor Leader of the House of Representatives; Chairman of the House Highways Committee; and instrumental in the creation of the Agate Pass Bridge between Bainbridge Island and the Olympic Peninsula.

Ford was born in New Rochelle, New York in 1911; graduated from high school in Glendale, California and earned  degrees in economics and political science from the University of Washington in Seattle.
He served in the United States Navy during World War II on minesweepers in Iceland and at the landing at Salerno.

Ford served as King County, Washington County Commissioner during the Seattle World's Fair and was instrumental in King County's acquisition of MaryMoor Farm/Park and later served as the manager of Seattle's Boeing Field.

He married Nancy Elizabeth McFate of South Colby, Washington; they had a daughter and a son. He died June 9, 2004, on Bainbridge Island at the age of 93, and was survived by his children Robert MacDonald Ford, III and Linda J. Ford (Cauthers).

He is known to history as a fellow sailor and close friend of Scientology founder L. Ron Hubbard. Ford said that when Hubbard asked for a letter of introduction, he gave Hubbard a blank sheet of letterhead which he later didn't know if he had signed, and told Hubbard "You're the writer, you'' write it."

References 

1941 L. Ron Hubbard letter of recommendation with signature
1951 photo of Ford on seventh row, sixth from the left.

1911 births
2004 deaths
King County Councillors
Democratic Party members of the Washington House of Representatives
Politicians from New Rochelle, New York
People from King County, Washington
20th-century American politicians
People from Bremerton, Washington